Sai Ngam is one of the seven subdistricts (tambon) of Sai Ngam district, in Kamphaeng Phet province, Thailand. It borders the subdistricts of Nong Mai Kong to the east, Nong Mae Taeng to the south, and Nong Khla and Maha Chai to the west. In the north it borders with the Lan Krabue district (Chong Lom and Non Phluang). In December 2021 this subdistrict had a population of 8,923.

Administration

Central administration
The tambon is subdivided into 10 administrative villages (muban).

Local administration
The area of the subdistrict is shared by 2 local governments.
the subdistrict municipality (Thesaban Tambon) Sai Ngam (เทศบาลตำบลไทรงาม)
the subdistrict administrative organization (SAO) Sai Ngam (องค์การบริหารส่วนตำบลไทรงาม)

References

External links
Website of Sai Ngam municipality
Website of Sai Ngam subdistrict administrative organization

Tambon of Kamphaeng Phet Province
Populated places in Kamphaeng Phet province